Butaro Hospital Cancer Center, or Butaro Cancer Centre of Excellence, is a public, specialized, tertiary care medical facility owned by the Rwanda Ministry of Health.

Location
The geographical coordinates of the facility are:1°24'33.0"S, 29°50'27.0"E (Latitude:-1.409167; Longitude:29.840833).

Overview
Butaro Cancer Centre is a cancer treatment, research, and teaching center, administered by Butaro District Hospital, and affiliated with medical school of University of Global Health Equity, both of which maintain campuses adjacent to the cancer center. Administratively, the cancer center is one of the specialized units of the hospital. It is the only specialized cancer unit in Rwanda's public healthcare system.

The establishment of the centre was informed by the high number of cancer patients, primarily from rural areas, who present late in the disease cycle, when treatment choices are limited and are less effective. Butaro Hospital and Butaro Cancer Center of Excellence were constructed and are operated by the Rwanda government and a consortium of international development partners, including Partners In Health (PIH), a Boston-based non-profit organization.

History
Butera District hospital was commissioned on 25 January 2011. In 2012 the hospital began offering cancer treatment in a ward designated as Butaro Cancer Center. As of 2018, nearly 4,900 cancer patients had received care at the hospital, during the first six years of the center. During the same time, 66 nurses had received specialized training in cancer care at the facility.

See also
 List of hospitals in Rwanda

References

External links
US firm to ease cancer treatment, cost in Rwanda As of 10 November 2017.

Medical research institutes in Rwanda
Burera District
2012 establishments in Rwanda
Hospitals in Rwanda
Cancer organizations